Count of Odemira (in Portuguese Conde de Odemira) was a Portuguese title of nobility granted to D. Sancho de Noronha by royal decree issued on 9 October 1446, by King Afonso V of Portugal.

Sancho de Noronha was the third son of  Alfonso, Count of Gijón and Noroña (natural son of King Henry II of Castile) and of  his wife Isabel of Portugal (natural daughter of King Fernando I of Portugal).

List of title-holders
 Sancho de Noronha (c.1390- ? );
Maria de Noronha, his daughter, married to Afonso, 1st Count of Faro;
Sancho de Noronha (c.1470- ? ), their eldest son;
Sancho de Noronha (c.1515-1573), his grandson;
Afonso de Noronha (c.1535-1578), his son, died in the battle of Alcácer Quibir;
Sancho de Noronha (1579–1641);
Francisco de Faro (c.1575- ? ) a distant cousin from a collateral branch;
Maria de Faro (c.1610-1664), married to the 1st Duke of Cadaval;
Joana de Faro (1661–1669), last countess of Odemira and countess of Tentúgal (as heir of the Duke of Cadaval).

See also
Count of Faro
List of countships in Portugal

External links
Genealogy of the Counts of Odemira, in Portuguese

Bibliography
"Nobreza de Portugal e Brasil" Vol III, pages 65/68. Published by Zairol, Lda., Lisbon, 1989.

Odemira
1446 establishments in Portugal